The William Prym GmbH is the oldest family business in Germany. The holding company is located in Stolberg (Rhineland).

History 

For twelve generations the Prym family has been operating from the city of Stolberg, Germany, making and marketing semi-finished copper and brass products as well as haberdashery. In the 17th and 18th centuries, they contributed substantially to establishing the local brass industry and its development towards international reputation. Johann (c.1340-c.1420), whose name is documented in a medieval register in Aachen, is referred to as the oldest ancestor. In the middle of the 15th century Wilhelm, a goldsmith, is mentioned as an administrator of an Aachen citizen. He is considered the founder of the family tradition in metal manufacturing and trade.

Due to the important zinc ore deposits of the region, the conditions for brass production were ideal at the time. Mainly Protestant families established through their skill and diligence the rapidly growing fame of brass and copper products from Aachen. At the
beginning of the 17th century, Protestants' loss of guild rights in Catholic Aachen forced these now homeless brass manufacturers to move. Eight families came to nearby Stolberg, a small settlement in the dukedom of Jülich-Cleve-Berg - the brass manufacturer Christian (1614–83) and his family being among them. In 1642 he settled down at Dollartshammer, the head office of the family company which is at the same location to this day. As his sisters Maria (bef.1610- 53) and Sara (1615–1696), he also married into the Peltzer family, one of the richest brass manufacturers of the region. Another sister, Catharina (1610–81), married Jeremias Hoesch (1610–53) in 1637.

In the 19th century the Pryms produced the first finished products made not only of brass, but also of steel and iron in addition to the rolled material and wires made of the traditional copper alloys. Under the management of William (1811–83) the company entered a new era of success. His son Heinrich August (1843–1927) did his apprenticeship in Birmingham and used the knowledge acquired there to introduce mechanical manufacturing of metal haberdashery in Germany.

Hans Friedrich (1875–1965), son of August, expanded the Austrian production and sales branches he had been leading since 1908, to a dominating position in the Austrian monarchy and the crown lands. In this period, in 1903, he made the ingenious improvement to the press fastener, already invented in 1885.

"Prym" and "Prym’s Zukunft" (Prym’s future) became the earliest brand names of the 20th century, the stag – featured in the family’s coat of arms – with a needle in his antlers one of the most famous trademarks. In the following years, Hans’ great commitment was to the export business. Thus, not long after World War One, he established a business in Schweidnitz (Silesia), a branch in Berlin for sales in the East, and a subsidiary in the USA. In 1932, he modernised the brass rolling mill in Stolberg established prior to the turn of the century, despite the general lack of orders. A decision that turned out to be economically extremely successful. During World War Two, the company produced turbine blades and war related materials in addition to its rolled materials, wires and haberdashery; however, Hans never became a member of the National Socialist Party.

Following World War Two, the considerable possessions of the family and the company in Berlin, Eastern Germany, Poland and Belgium were lost. Despite initial problems, in the years following the war, Hans managed to expand the zip fastener business with the newly developed plastic zip, "Prymalon", as an addition to the traditional products. In 1960, after prolonged negotiations, he was successful in buying back all Austrian properties and rights, which was of essential importance, particularly regarding the ”Prym” brand name. His marriage to Russian-born Olga Gütschow (1884–1975) in 1903 produced six sons, four of whom worked in the company. From 1928-72, Hans-August (1904–82) was head of "William Prym of America, Inc.", while Axel (1907–89) and Dieter (born 1917) held leading positions in the Stolberg head office which was expanding towards the Far East and Central America. Following the withdrawal of the British group, "Coats Viyella" (1976–93, with a 25% participation), the descendants of Heinrich Augusts once again became sole owners of the family company, probably the oldest in Germany.

After the strategically important sale of Prymetall (a leading manufacturer of semi-finished products of copper and copper alloys) to Aurubis, the company as a holding is divided into four independent divisions with numerous subsidiaries both in Germany and abroad: Prym Consumer (sewing and needlework accessories), Prym Fashion (fastening systems and accessories), Inovan (contact and electronic components), and Prym Intimates (accessories for intimate ware). As of 2021, members of the Prym family are still involved in the management of the business. The family stands for continuity in the development of this group of companies.

Price fixing 
In 2007 Prym was fined €40M by the European Commission for its part in operating a price fixing cartel, along with YKK and Coats plc. Prym's fine was much less than the other companies' as it alerted the Commission about the wrongdoing.

See also 
 List of oldest companies

Sources 
 Updated version of the New German Biography, Hist. Commission of the Bavarian Academy of Science, volume 20, P5997a, Andrea Prym-Bruck
 William Prym company archives
 Justus Hashagen: Geschichte der Familie Hoesch. 6 vol., Cologne: Neubner, 1911-1916
 F. Willems, P., History and Genealogy, 1968;
 Lothar Mathar; Augustus Voigt: Über die Entstehung der Metallindustrie im Bereich der Erzvorkommen zwischen Dinant und Stolberg. Lammersdorf üb. Aachen: Junker, 1969
 C. Bruckner, On the economic history of the regional district of Aachen, 1967, pp. 274–84;
 L. H. Meyer, Copper and brass industry, in: With water and steam, published by G. Fehl, and others, 1991, p. 178 ff.;
 History of copper and brass processing in the Aachen and Stolberg area, in: Zinkhütter Hof, museum guide, series of publications of the museum), 1996, pp. 14–24. – source: city archives of Aachen.

References

Further reading 

 Bert Fröndhoff: Erst die Firma, dann die Familie; Article in Handelsblatt, August 6, 2007.
 Andrea Prym-Bruck: Of flowers, ores, and family ties, in: Metal, publ. 11, 1992, pp. 1168–73;
 Andrea Prym-Bruck (Ed.): I need you: 100 Jahre Prym's Druckknopf, Begleitband zur gleichnamigen Ausstellung in Aachen 2003. Prym, Stolberg 2003, 
 Joachim Kornelius, Bernd van Boeckel, Erwin Otto (Ed.): Fingerhüte der William-Prym-Werke: die Geschichte einer alten Fingerhutproduktion mit Bildern des Warenkatalogs von 1934, Wissenschaftlicher Verlag Trier (WVT), Trier, 1988, 
 Franz Willems: Prym, Geschichte und Genealogie, Verlag Guido Pressler, Wiesbaden, 1968.

External links 
 Die Holding William Prym GmbH & Co. KG
 Die Prym Fashion GmbH & Co. KG
 Die Inovan GmbH & Co. KG
 Die Prym Consumer GmbH & Co. KG
 Die Prym Intimates Lanka (Pvt) Ltd

Companies based in North Rhine-Westphalia
Manufacturing companies of Germany
Sewing equipment
Stolberg (Rhineland)
1530 establishments in Europe
Manufacturing companies established in 1530